The Kosovo Protection Corps (KPC) was a civilian emergency services organisation in Kosovo active from 1999 to 2009.

The KPC was created on September 21, 1999, through the promulgation of UNMIK Regulation 1999/8 and the agreement of a "Statement of Principles" on the KPC's permitted role in Kosovo. In effect, it was a compromise between the disarmament of the Kosovo Liberation Army (KLA) which was stipulated by UNSCR 1244 and rejected by the Kosovar Albanians, transforming the KLA into KPC.

History

Immediately after the end of the 1999 Kosovo War and the dislocation of NATO forces in Kosovo, emerged the need for the definition of the Kosovo Liberation Army (KLA) role in accordance with the new situation. UN Resolution 1244, approved in June 1999, included KLA demilitarization.

Therefore, the same month, KFOR Commander, General Mike Jackson, and Hashim Thaçi, as General Commander of KLA, who at the time was Prime Minister of the Provisional Government in Kosovo, signed the Agreement for the Demilitarization and Transformation of the KLA.

Upon the completion of the demilitarization process, in September 1999 the UN Special Representative Bernard Kouchner signed Regulation nr 1999/8 for the foundation of the Kosovo Protection Corps (KPC), which then is followed by the Declaration of Principles, signed by the KPC Commander and the KFOR Commander.

Immediately following the approval of these acts, the International Organization for Migration (IOM) initiated the registration campaign of the KLA fighters, lasting from July 23 to November 31, 1999. According to IOM documents the total registration amounted to 25,723 members.

A number of KLA personnel joined the Kosovo Police.

Mission
UNMIK Regulation 1999/8 assigned the following tasks to the KPC:
Provide a disaster response capability to tackle major fires, industrial accidents or toxic spills;
Conduct search and rescue operations;
Provide humanitarian assistance;
Assist in de-mining;
Contribute to rebuilding infrastructure and communities.

The Kosovo Protection Corps has no role in defence, law enforcement, riot control, internal security or any other law and order tasks. The Special Representative of the UN Secretary-General (SRSG), the head of the UN in Kosovo, exercises direction, funding and administrative authority over the KPC. The Commander of KFOR, the NATO-peacekeeping force, is in charge of exercising day-to-day supervision of the KPC.

The KPC's first commander was Agim Çeku, who resigned from the organisation in 2006 to become Prime Minister of Kosovo. Lieutenant General Sylejman Selimi, a former KLA military leader, is the commander. The KPC is divided into six regional "Protection Zones," each with a regional commander. By 2001, each had an explosive ordnance disposal team, and there was a further centrally controlled team, making a total of seven teams. Allegations of misconduct and discipline violations have dogged the KPC since its formation. In June 2001, several senior officers in the KPC were removed for suspicion of aiding the ethnic Albanian insurgency in the Republic of North Macedonia.

The province is the subject of a long-running political and territorial dispute between the Serbian (and previously, the Yugoslav) government and Kosovo's ethnic Albanians. Most Albanians consider the KPC a potential nucleus of a future army should Kosovo win independence. International negotiations began in 2006 to determine the final status of Kosovo (see Kosovo status process) which led in 2007 to proposals for 'supervised independence' which did not gain approval from the UN Security Council. Those proposals called for the disbanding of the KPC within one year and the establishment of a new and lightly armed Kosovo Security Force (KSF).

In 2008 the KPC is standing down, with the simultaneous formation of the KSF. Their role will include explosive ordnance disposal as well as response to civil emergencies. The KSF has required that all prospective members apply, and that having served in the KPC does not guarantee a position with the KSF.

The KPC had 5,052 members, and a budget of €17.6 million (US$25.4 million) representing ca. 0.79% of GDP.

Notes and references
Notes:

References:

External links
 , September 20, 1999.
Structure of the Kosovo Protection Corps

Government of Kosovo
Emergency services in Kosovo
2000s in Kosovo
1999 establishments in Kosovo
2009 disestablishments in Kosovo